The Dover 400 (last held as the Drydene 311) was a NASCAR Cup Series stock car race held annually at Dover International Speedway in Dover, Delaware from 1971 to 2020 It was the second of two Cup Series races at the 1-mile concrete oval during that time.

Held in the fall, the race was part of the NASCAR playoffs from their start in 2004 until 2020, when the race was moved to the penultimate weekend of the regular season. However, that event then became part of a doubleheader with the rescheduled spring race in August due to the COVID-19 pandemic. The race length was also shortened to 311 miles for both events. The race was left off of the schedule in 2021 as Dover Motorsports, the track's owner, elected to move one it's two dates to Nashville Superspeedway as part of a schedule realignment.

Past winners

Notes
2005 and 2018: Race extended due to a NASCAR Overtime finish.
2012: Brad Keselowski's win marked the last win for Dodge.
2020: Race shortened to  due to schedule changes resulting from the COVID-19 pandemic.

Multiple winners (drivers)

Multiple winners (teams)

Manufacturer wins

Notable races

1971: Bobby Allison dominated the race until a lug bolt broke on a pit stop, putting Richard Petty into the lead in the final 100 laps en route to the win.
1975: Richard Petty put the entire field two laps down until at Lap 350 he ran over debris from a backmarker's blown engine that broke a tie rod.  Petty spent eight laps in the pits getting a new tie rod and came out six laps down.  While Lennie Pond blew his engine Petty erased all six laps, but needed a late yellow when Buddy Arrington stopped on the track with fifteen to go.  Petty breezed to the win, leaving runner-up Dick Brooks angry at Arrington, who'd recently purchased a transporter from Petty Enterprises: "I guess Arrington needed that truck paid for."
1976: Cale Yarborough lost two laps on two separate occasions and made them up en route to the win.
1977: Benny Parsons dominated the race after Lap 250.
1978: Bobby Allison won after a recent visit to the Mayo Clinic for a checkup.
1979: Richard Petty, Donnie Allison, and Cale Yarborough battled over the final 30 laps; Petty edged Allison by a hood at the stripe.
1980: Darrell Waltrip took the win, his final for DiGard Racing.
1981: Neil Bonnett stormed to his second win in the 1981 season's last three races as hard-luck Harry Gant led 178 laps but blew his engine with 63 laps to go.
1983: Bobby Allison edged Geoff Bodine for the win, his sixth of the season en route to his only Winston Cup title.
1986: Ricky Rudd took his first Dover win as title contenders Dale Earnhardt and Tim Richmond crashed and raced each other with damaged race cars despite being multiple laps down.
1991: Multiple crashes put Harry Gant alone on the lead lap for his third straight win of September 1991.
1992: Ricky Rudd edged Bill Elliott as Alan Kulwicki crashed, putting him seemingly out of the season point chase.
1993: Tire failures and crashes, including a multi-car melee detonated when Rusty Wallace hammered another car into the path of the leaders, plagued the 1993 500 won by Wallace.
1995: In a race with only five yellows flags, Jeff Gordon and Bobby Hamilton dominated en route to a 1-2 finish.
1996: Gordon and Dale Earnhardt battled amid an epidemic of crashes.  Ernie Irvan crashed ahead of Derrike Cope and crew chief Larry McReynolds attacked Cope in the garage area.  A three-car melee led to a near-brawl on the track between Jimmy Spencer and Wally Dallenbach Jr.  Following this race NASCAR raised the sanction fee for a 500-mile race, forcing Dover to cut back to 400 miles.
1998: Mark Martin won while Matt Kenseth finished sixth in his first career start; Kenseth substituted for Bill Elliott, who missed the race for his father's funeral.
2000: Tony Stewart went on to win the season sweep at Dover. This race also marked the first career start for driver Kurt Busch who replaced driver Chad Little in the John Deere Ford.
2001: In the first NASCAR sanctioned Cup race following the September 11, 2001 attacks, (the previous race scheduled for New Hampshire Speedway was postponed until the end of the season) a silent lap 3, which was a season-long scheduled event in memory of Dale Earnhardt who had died in a crash in the 2001 Daytona 500, was changed to include the memory of the victims of the attacks. Dale Earnhardt Jr. won the race and celebrated by doing a Polish victory lap while holding an American flag in salute. Notably, the white flag was not waved on the final lap, causing some confusion with the television broadcasting team.
2006: Jeff Burton broke a 175 race winless streak passing Matt Kenseth with 8 laps to go. This was a very emotional win for Jeff.
2009: Joey Logano flipped 8 times in turn 3 after being tapped by Tony Stewart, though a couple cars ahead of Logano had braked going into the corner. Logano suffered no injuries from the wreck.
2013: Jimmie Johnson held off Dale Earnhardt Jr. to take his eighth win at Dover, breaking a tie with Richard Petty and Bobby Allison for most all-time wins at the track. For Johnson, it allowed him to redeem himself for the restart line violation (when he'd jumped Juan Pablo Montoya on a late restart with 20 laps to go) that had cost him a shot at winning the race in June.
2017: Chase Elliott dominated the final stage of the race and was on the way to his first career win until Kyle Busch passed him coming to the white flag. Kyle Busch won the race for his second consecutive win and fourth of the season.
2018: After Chase Elliott lost the race the year before in the closing laps, he found redemption by fending off Denny Hamlin in a green-white-checkered finish on older tires. It was Elliott's first win on an oval, since his first Cup win was on a road course.

References

External links

 
NASCAR Cup Series races
Recurring sporting events established in 1971
1971 establishments in Delaware
Annual sporting events in the United States